WSAW-TV (channel 7) is a television station in Wausau, Wisconsin, United States, affiliated with CBS, MyNetworkTV, and The CW Plus. It is owned by Gray Television alongside low-power Fox affiliate WZAW-LD (channel 33). Both stations share studios on Grand Avenue/US 51 in Wausau, while WSAW-TV's transmitter is located on Rib Mountain.

To serve the Northwoods area of Northern Wisconsin, it operates a digital fill-in translator in Sayner (W21DS-D) that also covers Eagle River. This station broadcasts on UHF channel 21 (also mapping to virtual channel 7) from a transmitter on Razorback Road in unincorporated Vilas County (north of Sayner). The low-power repeater also serves the western portion of Michigan's Upper Peninsula although the broadcasting radius is limited to Marenisco and Watersmeet.

History
The station launched on October 23, 1954, as WSAU-TV, a sister station to WSAU radio (550 AM) and the original WSAU-FM (95.5, now WIFC; the current WSAU-FM is on 99.9 FM). It was originally owned by two groups who merged their applications in hearing: the radio station and the Wisconsin Valley Television Corporation, a consortium of North-Central Wisconsin newspapers that also included the Wausau Daily Record-Herald. Channel 7 originally operated from the Plumer Mansion, a Richardsonian Romanesque-style building, that was located on North 5th Street in Wausau and torn down in 1972 one year after the station moved to its current home.

The Plumer Mansion's castle-like exterior and a suit of armor displayed in the mansion inspired the station's graphic designer, Sid Kyler, to design a medieval-style blackletter "7" logo along with an accompanying cartoon mascot, the fully armored knight "Sir Seven".  The logo and mascot served as representations of the station for several decades. Wisconsin Valley expanded with WMTV in Madison and radio station WKAU in Kaukauna. In 1965, Wisconsin Valley purchased its first media holding outside of the state, KVTV in Sioux City, Iowa; as a consequence of doing business in other states, the firm renamed itself Forward Communications in January 1967.

Forward sold off WSAU and WIFC radio in 1980; the radio station retained the WSAU call sign, and Forward immediately applied for the call sign WSAW. The WSAW-TV call sign became effective on March 8, 1981.

It has been affiliated with CBS since its beginning although the station did have secondary affiliations with DuMont (until that network expired in 1956), ABC (until WAOW signed-on in 1965), and NBC (until WAEO [now WJFW-TV] launched in 1966). On September 5, 2006, WSAW added MyNetworkTV to a second digital subchannel. Its broadcasts have been digital-only since before midnight on February 16, 2009, when the analog sign-off featured a "good night" from Sir Seven. On April 2, 2011, WSAW became the first station in the market to broadcast local newscast in high definition.  With the switch to HD came a revamp of their news set and new graphics, along with a return of Sir Seven as the station's mascot in a newly CGI-rendered form.

On July 1, 2015, Gray bought the non-license assets of the market's Fox affiliate WFXS-DT (channel 55, owned by Davis Television, LLC). Due to Federal Communications Commission (FCC) ownership restrictions, a new low-power station (WZAW-LD channel 33) was established to become the area's Fox affiliate. All of WFXS' program streams including WFXS's existing PSIP channel numbering were then moved to the low-power outlet. Subsequently, WFXS ceased broadcasting after nearly sixteen years on-the-air and its studios on North 3rd Street in Wausau were shut down.

In consenting to the interference that would be caused by WZAW operating under special temporary authority on channel 31 (the same RF channel as WFXS) rather than its licensed channel 33, Davis Television stated that it would return the WFXS license to the FCC for cancellation following the sale. In August 2015, WSAW launched a prime time newscast on the Fox outlet known as WZAW News at 9. This half-hour broadcast offers direct competition to WAOW's thirty-minute, weeknight-only news airing at the same time on its CW digital subchannel (which aired on WFXS before July 1, 2015).

On October 1, 2015, the station began using its new studio. It was the first upgrade in a decade and took months to finish. The new studio includes two new state-of-the art sets: one each for WSAW and WZAW. Eventually, the WZAW-LD simulcast on WSAW's third subchannel was upgraded to high definition to provide full-market access to Fox programming in HD.

News operation
WSAW presently broadcasts 22½ hours of locally produced newscasts each week (with 4½ hours each weekday, and 2 hours each on Saturdays and Sundays).

Technical information
The stations' digital signals are multiplexed:

Translators

References

From Transdiffusion: A look at WSAW from the early-1980s and how it compares to British television
The history of channel 7

External links
Official website

Television channels and stations established in 1954
SAW-TV
CBS network affiliates
MyNetworkTV affiliates
MeTV affiliates
The CW affiliates
Start TV affiliates
Gray Television
Quest (American TV network) affiliates